is an archaic Japanese syllabary, now used for aesthetic purposes only. It represents an intermediate cursive form between historic man'yōgana script and modern hiragana.
Originating from cursive forms of the man'yōgana characters, commonly occurring sōgana were further adapted and by the early eleventh century had evolved into the forms of modern hiragana.

The principal purpose of Sōgana—nowadays its only use—was for artistic effect. It was often used for the rendition of poetry, as in the work of Fujiwara Kozei, whose style is often cited to exemplify the use of sōgana. However, attribution of the few surviving sōgana works is disputed.

References

Japanese writing system